Alvia is a high-speed train service in Spain used by Renfe Operadora for long-distance service with a top speed of . The trains have the ability to use both Iberian gauge and standard gauge, which allows them to travel on the recently constructed high-speed lines for part of the journey before switching to the "classic" Iberian gauge network to complete it. Trains that run exclusively on high-speed tracks are branded AVE or Avant.

Routes

, RENFE Class 120 / 121, RENFE Class 130 and RENFE Class 730 trains are in service.

Class 120 trains are used on the routes from Madrid to Pamplona, Logroño, Irún and Hendaye (France) (running on high-speed lines from Madrid to Burgos and changing gauge there), and between Barcelona and Irún, Bilbao (running on high-speed lines between Barcelona and Zaragoza).

Class 121 trains are employed on the routes from Madrid to Huelva, Ponferrada, Gijón and Santander changing gauge at Seville, León and Venta de Baños.

Class 130 trains are used on the routes from Madrid to Bilbao, Irún, and Hendaye (changing gauge at Burgos), from Alicante to Gijón and Santander changing gauge at León and Venta de Baños, between Castellón and Gijón (on high-speed lines from Castellón to León), and between Barcelona and Galicia.

Finally Class 730 are used on the routes from Madrid Chamartín to A Coruña, Ferrol, Vigo, Pontevedra, Lugo and Badajoz. These trains also operate the routes from Madrid to Murcia. Unlike the other classes, these can run on diesel as well as overhead electric power and so are used on those routes where lines are not electrified.

Operational services 

 Renfe offers the following Alvia services:

 Alicante–Santander, via Villena, Albacete, Cuenca, Madrid, Segovia, Valladolid, Palencia and Torrelavega.
 Barcelona–A Coruña, via Camp Tarragona, Lleida, Zaragoza, Tudela, Castejon, Tafalla, Pamplona, Vitoria-Gasteiz, Miranda de Ebro, Burgos, Palencia, Sahagun, León, Astorga, Bembibre, Ponferrada, O Barco de Valdeorras, A Rúa, San Clodio-Quiroga, Monforte de Lemos, Ourense and Santiago de Compostela.
 Barcelona–Bilbao, via Camp Tarragona, Lleida, Zaragoza, Tudela, Castejon, Calahorra, Logroño, Haro and Miranda De Ebro.
 Barcelona–San Sebastian, via Camp Tarragona, Lleida, Zaragoza, Tudela, Castejon, Tafalla, Pamplona, Altsasu and Zumarraga.
 Barcelona–Salamanca, via Camp Tarragona, Lleida, Zaragoza, Tudela, Castejon, Tafalla, Pamplona, Vitoria-Gasteiz, Miranda de Ebro, Burgos, Valladolid and Medina del Campo.
 Barcelona–Vigo, via  Lleida, Zaragoza, Pamplona, Vitoria-Gasteiz, Burgos, León, Ponferrada, Ourense and Guillarei, with connection services to Gijón in León and to A Coruña in Monforte de Lemos.
 Gijón–Oropesa Del Mar, via Oviedo, Mieres Del Camín, La Pola, León, Palencia, Valladolid, Segovia, Madrid, Cuenca, Requena Utiel, Valencia, Sagunto, Castellón and Benicàssim.
 Gijón–Vinaros, via Oviedo, Mieres Del Camín, La Pola, León, Palencia, Valladolid, Segovia, Madrid, Cuenca, Valencia, Sagunto, Castellón, Benicàssim, Oropesa del Mar and Benicarló.
 Gijón–Alicante, via Oviedo, Mieres Del Camín, La Pola, León, Palencia, Valladolid, Segovia, Madrid, Cuenca, Albacete and Villena.
 Madrid–A Coruña, via Zamora, Ourense and Santiago de Compostela.
 Madrid–Badajoz, via Leganés, Torrijos, Talavera De La Reina, Oropesa de Toledo, Navalmoral De La Mata, Monfragüe-plasencia, Cáceres and Mérida.
 Madrid–Bilbao, via Segovia, Valladolid, Burgos and Miranda de Ebro.
 Madrid–Badajoz, via Leganés, Torrijos, Talavera De La Reina, Oropesa, Navalmoral De La Mata, Monfragüe-plasencia, Cáceres and Mérida.
 Madrid–Cádiz, via Ciudad Real, Puertollano, Córdoba, Sevilla and Jerez de la Frontera.
 Madrid–Ferrol, via Segovia, Medina del Campo, Zamora, Sanabria, A Gudiña, Ourense, Santiago de Compostela, A Coruña, Betanzos and Pontedeume.
 Madrid–Gijón, via Valladolid, Palencia, León and Oviedo.
 Madrid–Huelva, via Cordoba and La Palma Del Condado.
 Madrid–Irun, via Segovia, Valladolid, Burgos, Miranda de Ebro, Vitoria-Gasteiz, Zumarraga, Tolosa and San Sebastián.
 Madrid–Logroño, via Guadalajara, Calatayud, Tudela and Calahorra
 Madrid–Lugo, via Segovia, Medina del Campo, Zamora, Sanabria, A Gudiña, Ourense, Monforte De Lemos and Sarria.
 Madrid–Cartagena, via Albacete, Hellin, Cieza, Murcia, Balsicas-mar Menor and Torre-pacheco.
 Madrid–Pamplona, via Guadalajara, Calatayud, Tudela and Tafalla.
 Madrid–Pontevedra, via Zamora, Sanabria, A Gudiña, Ourense, Santiago de Compostela and Vilagarcia De Arousa.
 Madrid–Salamanca, via Segovia and Medina del Campo.
 Madrid–Santander, via Valladolid, Palencia, Aguilar De Campoo, Reinosa and Torrelavega.
 Madrid–Santiago de Compostela, via Zamora, Sanabria, A Gudiña and Ourense.
 Madrid–Vigo, via Segovia, Medina del Campo, Zamora, Sanabria, A Gudiña, Ourense and Pontevedra.

Crash

On 24 July 2013, the train driver of an Alvia 730 train travelling to Ferrol, Galicia, from Madrid took a curve well above the posted speed limit, and derailed near Santiago de Compostela killing 81 people and injuring more than 140.

References

External links
RENFE Alvia 

High-speed rail in Spain
Renfe